Mohamad Akbar Bin Abdul Nawas is a Singaporean football coach and Head Coach of Udon Thani inThai League 2.

He was the head coach of Tampines Rovers in 2016 and led the team to the runners up position in the League. The team scored 52 goals in total, of which 30 goals in 12 games were scored in the second half of the season when Nawas took over. He also led Tampines to the Singapore Cup Final and emerged as runners-up and was a semi-finalist in the League Cup, where he introduced the reserve team players as most of the players from the first team were away with the national team. They lost to eventual winners Albirex in the League Cup semi-finals. He first joined as the assistant coach for the first team of Tampines Rovers under the then current national coach V. Sundramoorthy. Nawas' expertise is the attacking approach in football; this helped Tampines Rovers team to dominate possession in almost every game during his term as head coach and reduced the gap of seven points to only one point, guiding the team from fourth place to second place in the Singapore League. He prefers to use a 4-1-3-2 formation.

Playing career
Nawas captained the Professional Club side Trywhitt Under-19 side to third Place. He also played for the Singapore Under-19 and professional club side Trywhitt senior team. As a football player, Nawas was called up to play for the Singapore Pre–Olympic team and the national team for Under 23s and U19s.

From 1998 to 1999, Nawas played for Marine Castle United in the professional Singapore Football League.  He was then called up for training with the National "A" team for the Dunhill Cup after his stint with Marine Castle United. In 1999, he had an ACL operation and stopped playing competitive football. He joined the compulsory military service in 1996 and played football in the Police Force Home team. In 1995, Nawas started to play professionally in the Singapore Football Professional teams and he was called up for the Singapore Pre-Olympic and Jakarta Squad team respectively.

As a child, football became the life of Nawas. At the age of 10, he played in the junior and senior level of the Macpherson Primary School from 1985 to 1987. And from 1988 to 1992, Nawas played in the "C" and "B" Divisions for Macpherson Secondary School.

Nawas has an advanced diploma in business administration from University of Wales and has finished his degree in business administration and marketing from the same university.

Coaching and managing career
Nawas was the head coach of one of the top football clubs in the Philippines, Global Cebu Football Club starting in mid-June 2017. After the launch of the Philippine Football League in April 2017, Nawas became the technical training consultant and later on was offered the post of a head coach, the first Singaporean coach to handle a football team from the Philippines. Global Cebu Football Club made history as the first Philippine football club to reach the finals for the Singapore League, double firsts in the history of football in both countries. In 2016, Coach Nawas was the head coach of Tampines Rovers Football Club's senior team. Before taking this highest post in the east side football club in Singapore, he was the assistant coach for Tampines Rovers senior team in the Singapore League in 2015 and the head coach for the U21 Reserve team who emerged as champions in the Reserve League. In 2014, Nawas was the assistant coach to the technical director and coach in the National U21 and at the same time, the youth development manager for the Football Association of Singapore from 2011 to 2014. While doing his share of work in the FAS (Football Association of Singapore), Nawas assisted head coach Fandi Ahmad in training and as a match analyst for the Lions XI in pre-season (predominantly a U23 team with ten senior players, playing in the Malaysian Super Professional League) in 2013. And the year before, in 2012, he was the head coach for the National U14 team for an Invitational Tournament in Japan from April to June 2012.

Tampines Rovers
Nawas was appointed as head coach of Tampines Rovers FC in May 2016 in the middle of the 2016 S.League season taking over from V. Sundramoorthy who was appointed as head coach of the Singaporean national team. He led the club to a quarterfinal finish at the 2016 AFC Cup and was knocked out of the competition by eventual runners-up Bengaluru FC. Tampines Rovers finished as runners-up in the 2016 S. League season and the club was eligible to participate in the 2017 AFC Champions League qualifying play-offs. They lose against Filipino club, Global FC in their first match thus failing to advance in the play-offs. Nawas resigned in January 2017.

Global Cebu
In May 2017, it was reported that Nawas joined Global Cebu F.C., who participated in the inaugural season of the national professional Philippines Football League, as a technical consultant. He then helped the club in their 2017 AFC Cup match against Home United FC. After about a month, he was appointed as the Filipino club's head coach, taking over from interim coach Marjo Allado.

Chennai City FC
In March 2018 he joined I-League side Chennai City FC as head coach. Akbar, who was the former technical consultant of the club, takes over as the head coach from V Soundararajan after 
The team had finished  a disappointing eighth position in the 2017–18 I-League. In his first full season, he helped Chennai City overcome all odds to win the 2018-19 I-League season. He gained lots of praise and recognition for his work with the team, and his contract was renewed for the 2019–20 season.

Balestier Khalsa 
On 22nd October 2021, Akbar was announced as the Head Coach of Balestier Khalsa, succeeding Marko Kraljevic, who left a week prior. According to a club statement, Akbar has penned a two-year contract “worth more than S$170,000”. However, less than 1 year into the contract, Akbar would tender his resignation, and join Thai League 2 side Udon Thani FC, less than a week after a record 6-1 win against Hougang United.

Statistics

Managerial statistics
.

Honours

Managerial
Chennai City
I League: 2018–19
I-League Syed Abdul Rahim Award (Best coach): 2018–19

References

External links
 Akbar Nawas wants to develop 'thinking footballers' at Chennai City FC
 Akbar Nawas’ winning formula
 Interview with Akbar Nawas: The Singaporean tactician helming Chennai City FC's ascension

Living people
Singapore Premier League head coaches
Tampines Rovers FC head coaches
Singaporean football managers
Global Makati F.C. managers
1975 births
Chennai City FC head coaches
Akbar Nawas